The Erlang distribution is a two-parameter family of continuous probability distributions with support . The two parameters are:
 a positive integer  the "shape", and
 a positive real number  the "rate". The "scale",  the reciprocal of the rate, is sometimes used instead.

The Erlang distribution is the distribution of a sum of  independent exponential variables with mean  each. The Erlang and Poisson distributions are complementary, in that while the Poisson distribution counts the number of events that occur in a fixed amount of time, the Erlang distribution counts the amount of time until the occurrence of a fixed number of events. When , the distribution  simplifies to the exponential distribution. The Erlang distribution is a special case of the gamma distribution wherein the shape of the distribution is discretised.

The Erlang distribution was developed by A. K. Erlang to examine the number of telephone calls which might be made at the same time to the operators of the switching stations. This work on telephone traffic engineering has been expanded to consider waiting times in queueing systems in general. The distribution is also used in the field of stochastic processes.

Characterization

Probability density function 

The probability density function of the Erlang distribution is

The parameter k is called the shape parameter, and the parameter  is called the rate parameter.

An alternative, but equivalent, parametrization uses the scale parameter , which is the reciprocal of the rate parameter (i.e.):

When the scale parameter  equals 2, the distribution simplifies to the chi-squared distribution with 2k degrees of freedom. It can therefore be regarded as a generalized chi-squared distribution for even numbers of degrees of freedom.

Cumulative distribution function (CDF) 

The cumulative distribution function of the Erlang distribution is

The CDF may also be expressed as

Erlang-k 
The Erlang-k distribution (where k is a positive integer)  is defined by setting k in the PDF of the Erlang distribution.

Median
An asymptotic expansion is known for the median of an Erlang distribution, for which coefficients can be computed and bounds are known. An approximation is  i.e. below the mean

Generating Erlang-distributed random variates 

Erlang-distributed random variates can be generated from uniformly distributed random numbers using the following formula:

Applications

Waiting times 

Events that occur independently with some average rate are modeled with a Poisson process.  The waiting times between k occurrences of the event are Erlang distributed.  (The related question of the number of events in a given amount of time is described by the Poisson distribution.)

The Erlang distribution, which measures the time between incoming calls, can be used in conjunction with the expected duration of incoming calls to produce information about the traffic load measured in erlangs.  This can be used to determine the probability of packet loss or delay, according to various assumptions made about whether blocked calls are aborted (Erlang B formula) or queued until served (Erlang C formula).  The Erlang-B and C formulae are still in everyday use for traffic modeling for applications such as the design of call centers.

Other applications

The age distribution of cancer incidence often follows the Erlang distribution, whereas the shape and scale parameters predict, respectively, the number of driver events  and the time interval between them. More generally, the Erlang distribution has been suggested as good approximation of cell cycle time distribution, as result of multi-stage models.

It has also been used in business economics for describing interpurchase times.

Properties
If  then  with 
If  and  then  if  are independent

Related distributions

 The Erlang distribution is the distribution of the sum of k independent and identically distributed random variables, each having an exponential distribution.
 That is: if  then 
 Because of the factorial function in the denominator of the PDF and CDF, the Erlang distribution is only defined when the parameter k is a positive integer. In fact, this distribution is sometimes called the Erlang-k distribution (e.g., an Erlang-2 distribution is an Erlang distribution with ). The gamma distribution generalizes the Erlang distribution by allowing k to be any positive real number, using the gamma function instead of the factorial function.
 That is: if k is an integer and  then 
If  and  then 
The Erlang distribution is a special case of the Pearson type III distribution
The Erlang distribution is related to the chi-squared distribution. If  then 
The Erlang distribution is related to the Poisson distribution by the Poisson process: If  such that  then  and  Taking the differences over  gives the Poisson distribution.

See also
 Coxian distribution
 Engset calculation
 Erlang B formula
 Erlang unit
 Phase-type distribution
 Traffic generation model

Notes

References

 Ian Angus "An Introduction to Erlang B and Erlang C", Telemanagement #187 (PDF Document - Has terms and formulae plus short biography)
 Stuart Harris  "Erlang Calculations vs. Simulation"

External links 
Erlang Distribution
Resource Dimensioning Using Erlang-B and Erlang-C

Continuous distributions
Exponential family distributions
Infinitely divisible probability distributions